Dog Days is an American reality television series which aired on Animal Planet in the fall of 2002.  The show followed a number of New Yorkers, notably former Saturday Night Live choreographer Danielle Flora and top male model Edward Cruz, as they raised their pet dogs in New York City.

Dog Days aired eight episodes, and was not renewed for a second season.  It was produced by Steven Rosenbaum and his New York production company CameraPlanet.

External links
 

Animal Planet original programming
2002 American television series debuts
2002 American television series endings
2000s American reality television series
Television shows about dogs